The U.S. Post Office and Courthouse–Great Falls, also known as Great Falls Post Office and Courthouse, in Great Falls, Montana, is a three-story building constructed in 1912.  It was expanded by a two-story addition in 1937 and further expanded in 1967–68.

It was designed by James Knox Taylor and reflects Late 19th and 20th Century Revivals architecture and Second Renaissance Revival architecture.  It served historically as a courthouse and as a post office, and it was listed on the National Register of Historic Places in 1986.

It was deemed to be "an outstanding example of early Twentieth Century federal architecture in the Second Renaissance Revival mode" and it was asserted that it "symbolizes the early growth of the city and the federal government's recognition of city's importance as a regional center."

References

Post office buildings on the National Register of Historic Places in Montana
Courthouses on the National Register of Historic Places in Montana
Government buildings completed in 1912
Buildings and structures in Great Falls, Montana
Renaissance Revival architecture in Montana
1912 establishments in Montana
National Register of Historic Places in Cascade County, Montana